Lee Duncan may refer to;

 Lee Duncan, an American film actor
 Lee Duncan (animal trainer), the owner and trainer of Rin Tin Tin
 Lee Duncan, a pen name of Lawrence Block, an American crime writer

See also
 Leland Lewis Duncan, an English public servant, antiquary and author